Antonio-Agostinho-Neto International Airport  is an airport serving Pointe-Noire, a coastal city in the Republic of the Congo.

History
The airport was inaugurated in 1934; a new passenger terminal opened in 2006.

Airlines and destinations

Passenger

Cargo

Accidents and incidents
On 4 June 1969, a Douglas DC-3 of the Direcção de Exploração dos Transportes Aéreos was hijacked on a domestic flight from N'Zeto airport to Soyo Airport, Angola. The aircraft landed at Pointe Noire.
On 11 March 1994, Aéro-Service Swearingen Merlin TN-ADP was written off in a landing accident when the crew neglected to lower the undercarriage.
On 10 May 2007, Tenir Air Ilyushin Il-76TD EX-093 was destroyed in a fire whilst being loaded for a cargo fire.
On 15 September 2007, Veteran Airline Antonov An-12B UR-CEN was damaged beyond economic repair in a fire which occurred when the engines were being started.
On 25 January 2008, Canadian Airways Congo Boeing 727–247 9L-LEF was damaged beyond economic repair when it was struck on the ground by Aéro-Service Antonov An-12BP EK-11660 which suffered a brake failure while taxiing. The An-12 was also damaged beyond economic repair, but there were no injuries reported.
On 10 November 2008, Veteran Airline Antonov An-12 UR-PLV suffered an in-flight fire. A safe landing was made at Pointe-Noire but the aircraft was subsequently destroyed by fire.
On 21 March 2011, Trans Air Congo Antonov An-12 TN-AGK crashed on approach to Pointe Noire airport. All four crew were killed, as well as a number of people on the ground.
On 11 April 2020, an unoccupied Air France Airbus A330 F-GZCK was damaged by two gunshots while on the ground at Pointe Noire airport. The aircraft had been assisting in repatriation efforts during the 2019–20 coronavirus pandemic.

See also

List of airports in the Republic of the Congo
Transport in the Republic of the Congo

References

External links
Official web site
OurAirports - Pointe-Noire

Buildings and structures in Pointe-Noire
Airports in the Republic of the Congo